ETB Sat is the television channel that the Euskal Irrati Telebista group broadcasts worldwide.

This channel aims to bring television and Basque culture to Basques and others worldwide. Its programming is based primarily on self-produced content from the domestic flagship channels ETB 1 and ETB 2. The programming is offered in Spanish, Basque and French. On 1 May 2013, the channel decided to cease broadcasting on Astra satellite in Europe, focusing its availability on CATV operators and the online live streaming.

Canal Vasco ("Basque channel" in Spanish) is the name used to broadcast its contents via satellite and CATV operators in the Americas.

Programming
 Teleberri – News in Spanish language
 Gaur Egun – News in Basque language
 Lazkao Txiki – Cartoons
 Dokugune – Talk show
 EiTB Kultura – Cultural
 Exclusivas ETB – News reports
 Surf in` Euskadi – Surfing
 Objetivo Euskadi – Reports of actuality
 La Noche de... – Film program
 Vaya Semanita – Comedy show
 Basxtrem – Contest
 Chiloè
 Mihiluze – Word game in Basque

See also
Euskal Irrati Telebista
ETB 1
ETB 2
ETB 3
ETB 4
Canal Vasco

References

EITB
International broadcasters
Television channels and stations established in 2001